Nadine van der Velde (born May 14, 1962) is a Canadian actress, producer and writer. She is a three-time Emmy award winner, two-time Annie Award winner and a recipient of a Humanitas Award.

Early life and career
Nadine was born in Toronto, Ontario, Canada. She is fluent in French. She made her film debut in 1983 in the film Private School.  She later starred in the 1986 comedy horror Critters and 1987 film Munchies.  Her acting credits include several TV series including: Silver Spoons, Otherworld, The New Alfred Hitchcock Presents and JAG.

Career
Nadine has executive produced, story edited and written for several TV series including Miss Spider's Sunny Patch Friends, 65 episodes of Rolie Polie Olie, and 44 episodes of Breaker High. She co-wrote the indie feature East of A, which screened in over two dozen film festivals, including the Seattle Film Fest, Stockholm, Dublin, Outfest and San Francisco. Van der Velde partnered with her husband, Scott Kraft, and created the development and production company Popskull Inc. which has Van der Velde as co-creator and executive producer of The Fresh Beat Band, which first aired on August 24, 2009.  Van der Velde has written and music produced over 60 songs on the series. Nadine van der Velde was nominated for a 2012 Daytime Emmy in Outstanding Achievement in Main Title and Graphic Design for the show’s season 3 main titles.

Nadine has been nominated for two 2013 Daytime Emmys in the categories of "OUTSTANDING PRE-SCHOOL CHILDREN'S SERIES" and "OUTSTANDING ACHIEVEMENT" in MUSIC DIRECTION and COMPOSITION for her work as Executive Producer on The Fresh Beat Band. On June 14, 2013 Nadine van der Velde and The Fresh Beat Band team won a Daytime Emmy for Music Direction and Composition.

Filmography

References

http://www.wgc.ca/magazine/articles/spring_2007/wfiles.html

External links
 
 Nadine Van der Velde at Yahoo! Movies
 Nadine Van der Velde at Flixster
 

1962 births
Actresses from Toronto
American film actresses
American television writers
American people of Dutch descent
American people of Canadian descent
Canadian people of Dutch descent
Canadian film actresses
Living people
American women television writers
Writers from Toronto
21st-century American women